The Orcadian Women's Suffrage Association was an organisation involved in campaigning for women’s suffrage, based in Orkney, Scotland.

Formation 
The first meeting of the society was held in the house of James and Bina Cursiter on September 25, 1909. It was formed a month after a visit to Orkney by Chrystal Macmillan,  by the chair Mary Anne Baikie of Tankerness, who led the group to expand rapidly and to bring together men and women, to debate the political developments and to host leaders from national groups.

Activities 
The organisation was affiliated to the National Union of Women's Suffrage Societies. As such, their activities mirrored those of many other suffragist groups. They conveyed their message by addressing public meetings, distributing leaflets, and writing to the local press to promote the cause of women's suffrage.

In 1911, a banner, created by Stanley Cursiter and Christina Jamieson, of the Shetland Women's Suffrage Society, was taken to London for the Suffrage Coronation Procession.

Links to Scottish Women's Hospitals 
In 1912, Dr Elsie Inglis spoke at a meeting of the OWSS in her capacity as Honorary Secretary of the Scottish Federation of Women's Suffrage Societies. After the outbreak of WWI and the foundation of the Scottish Women's Hospitals for Foreign Service in 1914, the women of the OWSS raised a sum of £30 8s 6d which entitled them to name a bed for 6 months. The society chose to call the bed "Orcadian". Further donations followed and letters were received from soldiers who spent time in the bed.

Notable members 
 Dr Mary McNeill
 Bina Cursiter
James Cursiter, uncle of Stanley Cursiter

Further reading 
 King, Elspeth (1978) The Scottish Women’s Suffrage Movement. Glasgow. People’s Palace Museum 
 Leneman, Leah (1995) A Guid Cause: The Women’s Suffrage Movement in Scotland. Edinburgh. Mercat Press.
 Leneman, Leah (2000) The Scottish Suffragettes. Edinburgh. National Museums of Scotland. 190166340x
 Pedersen, Sarah (2017) The Scottish Suffragettes and the Press. London. Palgrave MacMillan. 9781137538338

See also 
In 2019, a short film about the society won an award at the Scottish Short Film Festival.

Feminism in the United Kingdom
List of suffragists and suffragettes
List of women's rights activists
List of women's rights organizations
Timeline of women's suffrage
Women's suffrage organizations

References 

Feminist organisations in the United Kingdom
Organizations established in 1909
Scottish suffragists
Women's organisations based in the United Kingdom
Suffrage organisations in the United Kingdom